Club Deportivo Real San Esteban  is a Salvadoran professional football club based in San Esteban Catarina, San Vicente, El Salvador.

The club currently plays in the Tercera Division de Fútbol Salvadoreño.

Football clubs in El Salvador